National Route 248 is a national highway of Japan connecting Gamagōri and Gifu in Japan, with a total length of .

See also

References

248
Roads in Aichi Prefecture
Roads in Gifu Prefecture